Children of the Corn (advertised as Stephen King's Children of the Corn) is a 1984 American supernatural slasher film based upon Stephen King's 1977 short story of the same name. Directed by Fritz Kiersch, the film's cast consists of Peter Horton, Linda Hamilton, John Franklin, Courtney Gains, Robby Kiger, Anne Marie McEvoy, Julie Maddalena, and R. G. Armstrong. Set in the fictitious rural town of Gatlin, Nebraska, the film tells the story of a malevolent entity referred to as "He Who Walks Behind the Rows" which entices the town's children to ritually murder all the town's adults, as well as a couple driving across the country, to ensure a successful corn harvest.

King wrote the original draft of the screenplay, which focused more on the characters of Burt and Vicky and depicted more history on the uprising of the children in Gatlin. This script was disregarded in favor of George Goldsmith's screenplay, which featured more violence and a more conventional narrative structure. Filming took place mainly in Iowa, but also in California. It spawned a franchise of films, and it has gained a cult following, inspiring the rap group with the same name.

Plot 
The film is set in the fictional town of Gatlin, Nebraska, an agricultural community surrounded by huge cornfields. When the corn crop fails one year, the townsfolk turn to prayer to ensure a successful harvest. However, 9-year-old Isaac Chroner takes all of the children in Gatlin into the cornfields and indoctrinates them into a religious cult based around a bloodthirsty deity called "He Who Walks Behind the Rows". Isaac and his subordinate Malachai lead the children in a revolution, murdering all of the adults in town as human sacrifices. Children Job and his sister Sarah are uninvolved in the sacrifices, having not attended the meetings in the cornfield with the other children. Sarah has visions portrayed through drawings.

Three years later, Vicky and her boyfriend Burt travel through rural Nebraska on their way to Seattle, where Burt will start working as a physician. Elsewhere, a young boy named Joseph tries to flee Gatlin, but is attacked in the corn; he stumbles out into the road and Burt accidentally runs over him. However, Burt discovers that his throat was cut beforehand. Burt and Vicky place Joseph's body and his suitcase in their trunk and search for a phone to call for help. They find Diehl, an elderly mechanic and the last adult in Gatlin, but he refuses them service, as he has agreed to supply the children with fuel in exchange for his life. However, Malachai breaks the pact and murders him against Isaac's wishes after Diehl tries to steer the couple away from Gatlin.

Vicky and Burt explore the abandoned town and find Sarah alone in a house. While Vicky stays with her, Burt searches the town. Malachai and his followers appear, capture Vicky, and take her to the cornfield, where they place her on a cross to be sacrificed. Burt enters the church, where a congregation of children led by a girl named Rachel are performing a cultural birthday ritual for Amos by drinking his blood from a pentagram-shaped cut on his body. Amos has turned 19, so is considered old enough for his "passing"—joining their god in the cornfield. Burt scolds the children for participating in a blood ritual. Rachel stabs Burt, then Malachai and the others chase him. Job rescues Burt and they hide in a fallout shelter with Sarah, where they learn Vicky was captured.

The zealous Isaac scolds Malachai for his treachery in killing Diehl, their only source of fuel. Malachai takes over, tired of Isaac's preaching, and orders Isaac to be sacrificed instead of Vicky. Isaac warns Malachai that sacrificing him will break their pact with He Who Walks Behind the Rows and the children will be severely punished. That night, Burt sneaks into the cornfield to rescue Vicky. During Isaac's sacrifice, a supernatural light appears and seemingly devours him. Burt emerges and overpowers Malachai, then convinces the children to abandon the cult and run for safety. Isaac suddenly reappears, revived by He Who Walks Behind the Rows. Informing Malachai that the deity is angered over him being sacrificed and that He Who Walks Behind the Rows wants Malachai sacrificed as well for his betrayal, Isaac kills Malachai.

A storm appears over the cornfield, and Burt and Vicky shelter the children in a barn. Burt reads a passage in the Bible Job gives him. Job also reveals that the police officer tried to set up the gasohol to stop He Who Walks Behind The Rows, but Malachai murdered him before he could finish. Vicky rereads the passage and realizes that the cornfield must be destroyed by fire in order to stop the false god. Burt sprays the cornfield with gasohol and tosses a Molotov cocktail into the field, setting it alight and destroying the demon along with Isaac. Vicky, Burt, Job, and Sarah return to the car to leave Gatlin, but find it disabled. Rachel attacks Burt, but Vicky knocks her out with the car door. Burt worries about leaving her there, but Vicky quips that they will send her a get-well card from Seattle, and they depart with the children on foot.

Cast 
 Peter Horton as Burt Stanton
 Linda Hamilton as Vicky Baxter
 R. G. Armstrong as Diehl ("The Old Man")
 John Franklin as Isaac Chroner
 Courtney Gains as Malachai Boardman
 Robby Kiger as Job
 Anne Marie McEvoy as Sarah
 Julie Maddalena as Rachel Colby
 Jonas Marlowe as Joseph
 John Philbin as Richard 'Amos' Deigan

Production 

Film rights were originally optioned by Hal Roach Studios, and Stephen King wrote a script based on his own short story. Hal Roach executives did not want to use King's script and George Goldsmith was hired to rewrite it. Goldsmith said that King's script started with 35 pages of Burt and Vicky arguing in a car, so he decided to tell the story visually through the eyes of two new characters, children Job and Sarah. King was unhappy with the changes but Hal Roach went with Goldsmith. King and Goldsmith debated Goldsmith's approach during a phone conversation during which King argued that Goldsmith did not understand the horror genre and Goldsmith countered that King did not recognize that film is a visual, "external" experience unlike novels and short stories, which are "internal" and only visual in the reader's mind.

The film was shot in Hornick, Iowa, Whiting, Iowa, Salix, Iowa, and Sergeant Bluff, Iowa.

Goldsmith credited King with being extremely gracious when asked about the film in media interviews, stating in diplomatic ways he felt the new approach to be lacking. Hal Roach eventually sold the project to New World Pictures, which decided to go with Goldsmith's script, although it tried unsuccessfully to remove his name from the credits in favor of King's. After release of the highly successful film, Goldsmith revealed that much of the story was a metaphor for the Iranian Revolution, with the takeover of the town by quasi-religious zealots acting for an evil "God" based on the Ayatollah Khomeini and his revolutionary guard taking over Iran. Burt and Vicky became analogous to the American hostages and Goldsmith was using a horror film to expose the dangers and evils of religious fundamentalism, something few critics recognized.

During an interview on The Ghost of Hollywood, Fritz Kiersch explained how Courtney Gains won the role of Malachai by using a prop knife to hold a casting assistant hostage at the audition. Gains claims that one of the great honors of his career is having hundreds of people, even his son's friends, recognize him as Malachai and confess they found him terrifying, some having admitted his performance gave them nightmares. Apparently, even his own parents were greatly unnerved by him in this film.

Because of seasonal changes, cornstalks had to be propped up and painted green to appear living.

Some of the local townspeople also performed as minor roles or acted as extras in the film.

Release

Critical response

On the review aggregator website Rotten Tomatoes, Children of the Corn holds a 39% approval rating based on 31 critic reviews, with an average rating of 4.2/10. The consensus reads: "Children of the Corns strong premise and beginning gets shucked away for a kiddie thriller that runs in circles". On Metacritic, which assigns a normalized rating to reviews, the film has a weighted average score of 45 out of 100, based on 6 critics, indicating "mixed or average reviews".

Roger Ebert from the Chicago Sun Times awarded the film one out of four stars, writing: "By the end of Children of the Corn, the only thing moving behind the rows is the audience, fleeing to the exits". Vincent Canby of The New York Times wrote: "As such movies go, Children of the Corn is fairly entertaining, if you can stomach the gore and the sound of child actors trying to talk in something that might be called farmbelt biblical". Ian Nathan from Empire Magazine gave the film three out of five stars, commending its originality, but criticized its obvious budgetary constraints, poor effects, and "ludicrous monster movie denouement". TV Guide awarded the film 1/5 stars, calling it "lame" and criticized the film's "gratuitous visual style". Rolling Stone ranked the film at No. 7 in its list of "Top 30 Stephen King Movies", calling it "a lean, brutally tense slasher film".

Remake and prequel 

In 2008, Donald P. Borchers began to write and direct a TV remake of the first film, which would premiere on the Syfy channel. Production began in August, filming in Davenport, Iowa, but was later moved to Lost Nation, Iowa.

The cast included David Anders, Kandyse McClure, Preston Bailey, Daniel Newman and Alexa Nikolas. The movie aired on September 26, 2009, and the DVD was released on October 6 by Anchor Bay. The television remake closely follows the original storyline present in the short story, and not that of the original film.

A new film adaptation was directed by Kurt Wimmer and produced by Lucas Foster and was filmed in Australia, during the COVID-19 pandemic. Initially reported to be a remake, the film served as a prequel to the 1984 film. The film was released on October 23, 2020.

See also 

 Children of the Corn (film series)
 Who Can Kill a Child? (1976)

References

External links 

 
 
 
 

1980s American films
1980s English-language films
1980s road movies
1980s slasher films
1980s supernatural horror films
1984 films
1984 horror films
Allegory
American exploitation films
American road movies
American slasher films
American supernatural horror films
Children of the Corn
Films about cults
Films about human sacrifice
Films about orphans
Films based on works by Stephen King
Films directed by Fritz Kiersch
Films scored by Jonathan Elias
Films set in 1980
Films set in 1983
Films set in a fictional location
Films set in Nebraska
Films shot in California
Films shot in Iowa
Folk horror films
Iranian Revolution films
New World Pictures films
Poisoning in film
Religious horror films
Supernatural slasher films